Cammie Lusko (born April 5, 1958) is an American athlete best known for her contributions to female bodybuilding in the 1980s.

Born in Los Angeles, California, Lusko entered her first bodybuilding contest in 1979, finishing third in the Robby Robinson Classic (Roark, 2005) in her hometown. The following year, she placed 9th in the inaugural Ms. Olympia competition.

Shifting her focus to Olympic style lifting, in 1983 she became the first woman to lift more than her body weight overhead with one arm (131 lbs.). She placed second that year in the 60 kg class of the Women's National Olympic weightlifting competition (60.0 kg snatch and 82.5 kg clean and jerk for a total of 142.5 kg). At guest posings, Lusko did a strongwoman act in which she (at a bodyweight of approximately 130 pounds) pressed men weighing nearly 200 pounds overhead, and jerked a 135-pound dumbbell overhead.

Contest history
1979 Robby Robinson Classic - 3rd
1979 US Women's Championship - 3rd
1980 IFBB Ms. Olympia - 9th

References

Roark, Joe, "Featuring 2005 Hall of Fame Inductee:  Stacey Bentley", Flex, August, 2005

1958 births
Living people
American female bodybuilders
Strongwomen
Professional bodybuilders
21st-century American women